Leonard Stanisław Danilewicz was a Polish engineer and, for some ten years before the outbreak of World War II, one of the four directors of the AVA Radio Company in Warsaw, Poland.

Cipher Bureau work
AVA designed and built radio equipment for the Polish General Staff's Cipher Bureau, which was responsible for the radio communications of the General Staff's Oddział II (Section II, the General Staff's intelligence section).

Beginning in 1933, after the Cipher Bureau's mathematician-cryptologist Marian Rejewski reconstructed the German military Enigma rotor cipher machine, AVA built Enigma "doubles" as well as all the electro-mechanical equipment subsequently designed at the Cipher Bureau to expedite routine breaking and reading of Enigma ciphers.

AVA's other directors were Edward Fokczyński, Antoni Palluth, and Leonard Danilewicz's elder brother, Ludomir Danilewicz.  The company took its name from the combined radio callsigns of the Danilewicz brothers (TPAV) and Palluth (TPVA).  When the company was being formed about 1929, the Danilewicz brothers were short-wave "hams" and students at the Warsaw Polytechnic.

Leonard Danilewicz early showed remarkable creativity as a radio designer, coming up with a concept for a frequency-hopping spread spectrum:

See also
AVA Radio Company
Spread spectrum
Frequency-hopping spread spectrum
List of multiple discoveries
Biuro Szyfrów (Cipher Bureau)
Marian Rejewski
Enigma machine
Cryptanalysis of the Enigma
Ultra
Lacida

Notes

References
Władysław Kozaczuk, Enigma: How the German Machine Cipher Was Broken, and How It Was Read by the Allies in World War Two, edited and translated by Christopher Kasparek, Frederick, MD, University Publications of America, 1984, .

External links
 Laurence Peter,  How Poles cracked Nazi Enigma secret, BBC News, 20 July 2009

Polish engineers
Amateur radio people